Royal Pages School is the English name of two different Thai institutions:
 The Royal Pages School was the precursor to Chulalongkorn University which existed from 1 April 1902 to 1 January 1911, after which it was reestablished as the Civil Service College of King Chulalongkorn.
 The Royal Pages School was the name of Vajiravudh College prior to its merger with King's College on 16 April 1926.